Laws restricting, regulating, or banning circumcision, some dating back to ancient times, have been enacted in many countries and communities. In modern states, circumcision is generally presumed to be legal, but laws pertaining to assault or child custody have been applied in cases involving circumcision. In the case of non-therapeutic circumcision of children, proponents of laws in favor of the procedure often point to the rights of the parents or practitioners, namely the right of freedom of religion. Those against the procedure point to the boy's right of freedom from religion. In several court cases, judges have pointed to the irreversible nature of the act, the grievous harm to the boy's body, and the right to self-determination, and bodily integrity.

History

Judaism 

There are ancient religious requirements for circumcision. The Hebrew Bible commands Jews to circumcise their male children on the eighth day of life, and to circumcise their male slaves.

Laws which ban circumcision are also ancient. The ancient Greeks prized the foreskin and disapproved of the Jewish custom of circumcision. 1 Maccabees, 1:60–61 states that King Antiochus IV of Syria, the occupying power of Judea in 170 BCE, outlawed circumcision on penalty of death, one of the grievances leading to the Maccabean Revolt.

The German Academy for Pediatric and Adolescent Medicine (Deutsche Akademie für Kinder- und Jugendmedizin e.V., DAKJ), the German Association for Pediatric Surgery (Deutsche Gesellschaft für Kinderchirurgie, DGKCH) and the Professional Association of Pediatric and Adolescent Physicians (Berufsverband der Kinder- und Jugendärzte) took a firm stand against non-medical routine infant circumcision.

In July, in Berlin, a criminal complaint was lodged against Rabbi Yitshak Ehrenberg for "causing bodily harm" by performing religious circumcision, and for vocal support of the continuation of the practice. In September, the prosecutors dismissed the complaint, concluding that "there is no proof to establish that the rabbi's conduct met the 'condition of a criminal' violation".

In September, Reuters reported "Berlin's senate said doctors could legally circumcise infant boys for religious reasons in its region, given certain conditions."

On 12 December 2012, following a series of hearings and consultations, the Bundestag adopted the proposed law explicitly permitting non-therapeutic circumcision to be performed under certain conditions; it is now §1631(d) in the German Civil Code. The vote tally was 434 ayes, 100 noes, and 46 abstentions. Following approval by the Bundesrat and signing by the Bundespräsident, the new law became effective on 28 December 2012 a day after its publication in the Federal Gazette.

Iceland 
In May 2005, Iceland amended its General Penal Code to criminalise female genital mutilation

In February 2018, the Progressive Party proposed a bill that would change the words "girl child" to "child" and "her sexual organs" to "[their] sexual organs", thereby making Iceland the first European country to ban male circumcision for non-medical reasons. The bill discussed in the Alþing, the Icelandic parliament, claimed the practice harmed the physical integrity of young boys, was often performed without anaesthesia and in an unhygienic manner by religious leaders instead of medical experts. These facts were deemed incompatible with the United Nations Convention on the Rights of the Child (1990). Critics argued the bill infringed on religious freedom or constituted antisemitism or anti-Muslim bigotry, making it hard for Muslims and Jews to live there. Silja Dögg Gunnarsdóttir, who proposed the ban, retorted that Iceland had already prohibited female circumcision in 2005, and "If we have laws banning circumcision for girls, then we should do so for boys." She also invoked the UN Children's Rights Convention and the 2013 Nordic ombudsmen statement to support the proposal. On 29 April, the bill was sent back to Parliament for revisions. On 25 March 2018, members of Jews Against Circumcision spoke in the Alþing expressing their support for the proposed ban, dismissing claims that it was motivated by antisemitism, anti-Muslim bigotry, xenophobia or anti-immigration sentiment. The law was put on hold in 2018 following pressure from the United States, Israel, and various lobbyist groups.

In favour of the proposed ban (March 2018)
 Progressive Party
 People's Party
 Left-Green Movement
 Pirate Party
 Jews Against Circumcision

Against the proposed ban (March 2018)
 European Jewish Congress
 Islamic Cultural Centre of Iceland
 Catholic Church
 Anti-Defamation League

Ireland 
In October 2005 a Nigerian man was cleared of a charge of reckless endangerment over the death of a baby from hemorrhage and shock after he had circumcised the child. The judge directed the jury not to "bring what he called their white western values to bear when they were deciding this case" and effectively imposed a not guilty verdict on the jury. After deliberating for an hour and a half they found the defendant not guilty.

Israel 
In Israel, Jewish circumcision is entirely legal. The circumcision rate is very high in Israel, although some limited data suggests the practice is slowly declining. According to an online survey by the parents' portal Mamy in 2006, the rate was 95%, while earlier estimates put it at 98–99%. Ben Shalem, an organisation dedicated to the abolition of circumcision, petitioned the Supreme Court in 1999 on the grounds that circumcision violated human dignity, children's rights and criminal law. The petition was rejected. In 2013, a Rabbinical court in Israel ordered a mother in the midst of divorce proceedings to circumcise her son in accordance with the father's wishes, or pay a fine of 500 Israeli Shekel for every day that the child is not circumcised. She appealed against the Rabbinical court ruling and the High Court ruled in her favour stating, among other considerations, the basic right of freedom from religion.

Netherlands 

The Royal Dutch Medical Association (KNMG) finds non-therapeutic circumcision of male minors to be in conflict with children's right to autonomy and physical integrity, and that there are good reasons for its legal prohibition, as exists for female genital mutilation: 

In May 2008 a father who had his two sons, aged 3 and 6, circumcised against the will of their mother was found not guilty of abuse as the circumcision was performed by a physician and due to the court's restraint in setting a legal precedent; instead he was given a 6-week suspended jail sentence for taking the boys away from their mother against her will.

The parquet of the Supreme Court of the Netherlands made an elaborate statement on the legal status of circumcision on 5 July 2011 in the course of a criminal case. First, the parquet notes that there is no law that specifically prohibits the circumcision of boys, nor that the practice falls under the more general crime of (zware) mishandeling ('(grave) assault'). "Genital mutilation of girls in any case undoubtedly falls under (zware) mishandeling (Art. 300–303 Dutch Criminal Code). Whereas most forms of genital cutting of girls are generally marked as genital mutilation, a similar communis opinio regarding genital cutting of boys does not yet exist so far." The Supreme Court acknowledged that society's attitudes on genital cutting of boys had been gradually shifting over the course of years, and that "the increasing concern [in the medical world] about the harm and the risk of complications during a circumcision is indeed relevant", but that overall there were not enough reasons yet to proceed to criminalisation. Neither could intentional infliction of grave bodily harm (Art. 82 Dutch Criminal Code) be applied to the normal circumstances of a competently and hygienically performed circumcision in a clinic. And because young children are incapable of exercising the right to self-determination, parents ought to do this on their behalf. They can both request a circumcision to be performed, as well as consent to it being performed, on the grounds of their parental authority. However, it is important that both parents consent to the procedure.

In favour of a ban
 Christian Union, political party, on the basis of Article 11 of the Constitution concerning bodily integrity (from 2006 to 2011) 
 Royal Dutch Medical Association (KNMG), federation of physicians (since 2010)
 Youth Organisation Freedom and Democracy, youth wing People's Party for Freedom and Democracy (VVD) (since 2014)
 Young Democrats, youth wing Democrats 66 (D66) (since 2017, favours a gradual increase of the minimum age for circumcision)
 PINK!, youth wing Party for the Animals (PvdD) (since 2018)

Against a ban
 Council of Public Health and Care (RVZ), medical advisory committee for parliament and government (since 2010)
 Rabbi Herman Loonstein, president of Federative Jewish Netherlands
 Christian Union, political party, on the basis of Article 6 of the Constitution concerning freedom of religion (since 2011)

Norway 
The Norwegian Ombudsman for Children (Barneombudet) opposes circumcising children, and stated on 29 September 2013 that it is right to wait until children are old enough to decide for themselves: 

In June 2012, the centre-right Centre Party proposed a ban on circumcision on males under eighteen, after an Oslo infant died in May following a circumcision.

A bill on ritual circumcision of boys was passed (against two votes) in the Norwegian Parliament in June 2014, with the new law going into effect on 1 January 2015. This law explicitly allows Jews to practice brit milah and obligates the Norwegian Health Care regions to offer the Muslim minority a safe and affordable procedure. Local anaesthesia needs to be applied and a licensed physician needs to be present at the circumcision, which hospitals started to perform in March 2015.

In May 2017, the right-wing Progress Party proposed to ban circumcision for males under sixteen.

In favour of a ban
 Centre Party (under 18, since 2012)
 Progress Party (under 16, since 2017)
 Norwegian Ombudsman for Children

South Africa 
The Children's Act 2005 makes the circumcision of male children under 16 unlawful except for religious or medical reasons. In the Eastern Cape province the Application of Health Standards in Traditional Circumcision Act, 2001, regulates traditional circumcision, which causes the death or mutilation of many youths by traditional surgeons each year. Among other provisions, the minimum age for circumcision is age 18.

In 2004, a 22-year-old Rastafarian convert was forcibly circumcised by a group of Xhosa tribal elders and relatives. When he first fled, two police returned him to those who had circumcised him. In another case, a medically circumcised Xhosa man was forcibly recircumcised by his father and community leaders. He laid a charge of unfair discrimination on the grounds of his religious beliefs, seeking an apology from his father and the Congress of Traditional Leaders of South Africa. According to South African newspapers, the subsequent trial became "a landmark case around forced circumcision". In October 2009, the Eastern Cape High Court at Bhisho (sitting as an Equality Court) clarified that circumcision is unlawful unless done with the full consent of the initiate.

Slovenia 
The Slovenian Human Rights Ombudsman found in February 2012, after consulting various relevant expert bodies and studying relevant constitutional and legal stipulations, that circumcision for non-medical reasons is a violation of children's rights, that ritual circumcision for religious reasons is unacceptable in Slovenia for both legal and ethical reasons and should not be performed by doctors:

Sweden 
In 2001, the Parliament of Sweden enacted a law allowing only persons certified by the National Board of Health to circumcise infants. It requires a medical doctor or an anesthesia nurse to accompany the circumciser and for anaesthetic to be applied beforehand. After the first two months of life circumcisions can only be performed by a physician. The stated purpose of the law was to increase the safety of the procedure.

Swedish Jews and Muslims objected to the law, and in 2001, the World Jewish Congress called it "the first legal restriction on Jewish religious practice in Europe since the Nazi era". The requirement for an anaesthetic to be administered by a medical professional is a major issue, and the low degree of availability of certified professionals willing to conduct circumcision has also been subject to criticism. According to a survey, two out of three paediatric surgeons said they refuse to perform non-therapeutic circumcision, and less than half of all county councils offer it in their hospitals. However, in 2006, the U.S. State Department stated, in a report on Sweden, that most Jewish mohels had been certified under the law and 3000 Muslim and 40–50 Jewish boys were circumcised each
year. An estimated 2000 of these are performed by persons who are neither physicians nor have officially recognised certification.

The Swedish National Board of Health and Welfare reviewed the law in 2005 and recommended that it be maintained, but found that the law had failed with regard to the intended consequence of increasing the safety of circumcisions. A later report by the Board criticised the low level of availability of legal circumcisions, partly due to reluctance among health professionals. To remedy this, the report suggested a new law obliging all county councils to offer non-therapeutic circumcision in their hospitals, but this was later abandoned in favour of a non-binding recommendation.

In January 2014, the Swedish Medical Association (SLF) found no known medical benefits to circumcision of children, and thus strong reasons to wait until the boy is old and mature enough (12 or 13 years old) to give informed consent, aiming at ceasing all non-medically justified circumcision without prior consent:

In October 2018, the right-wing populist Sweden Democrats party submitted a draft motion to parliament calling for a ban. At the annual conference of the Centre Party in September 2019, 314 to 166 commissioners voted in favor of prohibiting boys' circumcision. Several Jewish and Islamic organisations voiced their opposition to a potential ban. The Left Party has also expressed support for a prohibition on circumcising boys before the age of 18; other parties have so far not backed a potential ban, though the Green Party found the practice "problematic".

In favour of a ban
 Sweden Democrats
 Centre Party
 Left Party
 Swedish Ombudsman for Children
 Swedish Medical Association

Against a ban
 Christian Democrats
 Liberals
 Moderate Party
 Swedish Social Democratic Party
 Green Party (does find circumcision "problematic")

Switzerland 
According to a July 2012 survey by 20 Minuten involving 8,000 participants, 64% of the Swiss population wanted religious circumcision to be banned. 67% of men and 56% of women were in favour. 93% of Muslim respondents and 75% of Jewish respondents opposed a ban. Over 25% of male respondents were themselves circumcised; 96% of Muslim men and 89% of Jewish men in the survey said they were circumcised, while 20% of circumcised men belonged to neither religion. Almost a third of circumcised men favoured a ban, with 12% wishing in hindsight that they had not been circumcised.

United Kingdom 
Male circumcision has traditionally been presumed to be legal under British law, however some authors have argued that there is no solid foundation for this view in English law.

While legal, the British Medical Association finds it ethically unacceptable to circumcise a child or young person, either with or without competence, who refuses the procedure, irrespective of the parents' wishes, and that parental preference alone does not constitute sufficient grounds for performing NTMC on a child unable to express his own view: 

The passage of the Human Rights Act 1998 has led to some speculation that the lawfulness of the circumcision of male children is unclear.

One 1999 case, Re "J" (child's religious upbringing and circumcision) said that circumcision in Britain required the consent of all those with parental responsibility (however this comment was not part of the reason for the judgement and therefore is not legally binding), or the permission of the court, acting for the best interests of the child, and issued an order prohibiting the circumcision of a male child of a non-practicing Muslim father and non-practicing Christian mother with custody. The reasoning included evidence that circumcision carried some medical risk; that the operation would be likely to weaken the relationship of the child with his mother, who strongly objected to circumcision without medical necessity; that the child may be subject to ridicule by his peers as the odd one out and that the operation might irreversibly reduce sexual pleasure, by permanently removing some sensory nerves, even though cosmetic foreskin restoration might be possible. The court did not rule out circumcision against the consent of one parent. It cited a hypothetical case of a Jewish mother and an agnostic father with a number of sons, all of whom, by agreement, had been circumcised as infants in accordance with Jewish laws; the parents then have another son who is born after they have separated; the mother wishes him to be circumcised like his brothers; the father for no good reason, refuses his agreement. In such a case, a decision in favor of circumcision was said to be likely.

In 2001 the General Medical Council had found a doctor who had botched circumcision operations guilty of abusing his professional position and that he had acted "inappropriately and irresponsibly", and struck him off the register. A doctor who had referred patients to him, and who had pressured a mother into agreeing to the surgery, was also condemned. He was put on an 18-month period of review and retraining, and was allowed to resume unrestricted practice as a doctor in March 2003, after a committee found that he had complied with conditions it placed on him. According to the Northern Echo, he "told the committee he has now changed his approach to circumcision referrals, accepting that most cases can be treated without the need for surgery".

Fox and Thomson (2005) argue that consent cannot be given for non-therapeutic circumcision. They say there is "no compelling legal authority for the common view that circumcision is lawful".

In 2005 a Muslim man had his son circumcised against the wishes of the child's mother who was the custodial parent.

In 2009 it was reported that a 20-year-old man whose father had him ritually circumcised as a baby is preparing to sue the doctor who circumcised him. This is believed to be the first time a person who was circumcised as an infant has made a claim in the UK. The case is expected to be heard in 2010.

In a 2015 case regarding female circumcision, a judge concluded that non-therapeutic circumcision of male children is a "significant harm". In 2016, the Family Court in Exeter ruled that a Muslim father could not have his two sons (aged 6 and 4) circumcised after their mother disagreed. Mrs Justice Roberts declared that the boys should first grow old enough "to the point where each of the boys themselves will make their individual choices once they have the maturity and insight to appreciate the consequences and longer-term effects of the decisions which they reach".

Nottingham case 

In June 2017, Nottinghamshire Police arrested three people on suspicion of "conspiracy to commit grievous bodily harm". The alleged victim was purportedly circumcised while in its Muslim father's care at his grandparents' in July 2013 without the consent of his mother (a non-religious white British woman who conceived the child after a casual affair with the man, whom she had separated from after the incident). The mother first contacted social services and eventually the police in November 2014. The police initially dismissed the complaint, but after the mother got help from the anti-circumcision group Men Do Complain and leading human rights lawyer Saimo Chahal QC, they reopened the case, and ended up arresting three suspects involved. In November 2017, the Crown Prosecution Service explained to the mother in a letter they were not going to prosecute the doctor, who claimed he was unaware of the mother's non-consent. However, Chahal appealed this decision, which she said "lacks any semblance of a considered and reasoned decision and is flawed and irrational", and threatened to bring the case to court. The by then 29-year-old mother finally sued the doctor in April 2018. Niall McCrae, mental health expert from King's College London, argued that this case could mean "the end of ritual male circumcision in the UK", drawing comparisons with earlier rulings against female genital mutilation.

United States 

Circumcision of adults who grant personal informed consent for the surgical operation is legal.

In the United States, non-therapeutic circumcision of male children has long been assumed to be lawful in every jurisdiction provided that one parent grants surrogate informed consent. Adler (2013) has recently challenged the validity of this assumption. As with every country, doctors who circumcise children must take care that all applicable rules regarding informed consent and safety are satisfied.

While anti-circumcision groups have occasionally proposed legislation banning non-therapeutic child circumcision, it has not been supported in any legislature. After a failed attempt to adopt a local ordinance banning circumcision on a San Francisco ballot, the state of California enacted in October 2011 a law protecting circumcision from local attempts to ban the practice.

In 2012, New York City required those performing metzitzah b'peh, the oral suction of the open circumcision wound required by Hasidim, to obey stringent consent requirements, including documentation. Agudath Israel of America and other Jewish groups have planned to sue the city in response.

Disputes between parents

Occasionally the courts are asked to make a ruling when parents cannot agree on whether or not to circumcise a child.

In January 2001 a dispute between divorcing parents in New Jersey was resolved when the mother, who sought to have the boy circumcised withdrew her request. The boy had experienced two instances of foreskin inflammation and she wanted to have him circumcised. The father, who had experienced a traumatic circumcision as a child, objected and they turned to the courts for a decision. The Medical Society of New Jersey and the Urological Society of New Jersey both opposed any court ordered medical treatment. As the parties came to an agreement, no precedent was set. In June 2001 a Nevada court settled a dispute over circumcision between two parents but put a strict gag order on the terms of the settlement. In July 2001 a dispute between parents in Kansas over circumcision was resolved when the mother's request to have the infant circumcised was withdrawn. In this case the father opposed circumcision while the mother asserted that not circumcising the child was against her religious beliefs. (The woman's pastor had stated that circumcision was "important" but was not necessary for salvation.) On 24 July 2001 the parents reached agreement that the infant would not be circumcised.

On 14 July 2004 a mother appealed to the Missouri Supreme Court to prevent the circumcision of her son after a county court and the Court of Appeals had denied her a writ of prohibition. However, in early August 2004, before the Supreme Court had given its ruling, the father, who had custody of the boy, had him circumcised.

In October 2006 a judge in Chicago granted an injunction blocking the circumcision of a 9-year-old boy. In granting the injunction the judge stated that "the boy could decide for himself whether to be circumcised when he turns 18."

In November 2007, the Oregon Supreme Court heard arguments from a divorced Oregon couple over the circumcision of their son. The father wanted his son, who turned 13 on 2 March 2008, to be circumcised in accordance with the father's religious views; the child's mother opposes the procedure.  The parents dispute whether the boy is in favor of the procedure. A group opposed to circumcision filed briefs in support of the mother's position, while some Jewish groups filed a brief in support of the father. On 25 January 2008, the Court returned the case to the trial court with instructions to determine whether the child agrees or objects to the proposed circumcision. The father appealed to the US Supreme Court to allow him to have his son circumcised but his appeal was rejected. The case then returned to the trial court. When the trial court interviewed the couple's son, now 14 years old, the boy stated that he did not want to be circumcised. This also provided the necessary circumstances to allow the boy to change residence to live with his mother. The boy was not circumcised.

Other disputes

In September 2004 the North Dakota Supreme Court rejected a mother's attempt to prosecute her doctor for circumcising her child without fully informing her of the consequences of the procedure. The judge and jury found that the plaintiffs were adequately informed of possible complications, and the jury further found that it is not incumbent on the doctors to describe every "insignificant" risk.

In March 2009 a Fulton County, GA, State Court jury awarded $2.3 million in damages to a 4-year-old boy and his mother for a botched circumcision in which too much tissue was removed causing permanent disfigurement.

In August 2010 an eight-day-old boy was circumcised in a Florida hospital against the stated wishes of the parents. The hospital admitted that the boy was circumcised by mistake; the mother has sued the hospital and the doctor involved in the case.

See also 
 Khitan (circumcision)
 Children's rights
 Ethics of circumcision
 Forced circumcision
 FGM
 Sexual consent in law
 Violence against men

References

External links
 William E. Brigman. Circumcision as Child Abuse: The Legal and Constitutional Issues. 23 J Fam Law 337 (1985).
 Rich Winkel. Male Circumcision in the USA: A Human Rights Primer 
 Ross Povenmire. Do Parents Have the Legal Authority to Consent to the Surgical Amputation of Normal, Healthy Tissue From Their Infant Children?: The Practice of Circumcision in the United States. 7 Journal of Gender, Social Policy & the Law 87 (1998–1999).
 Gregory J Boyle, J. Steven Svoboda, Christopher P Price, J Neville Turner. Circumcision of Healthy Boys: Criminal Assault? 7 Journal of Law and Medicine 301 (2000). The authors are leading anti-circumcision campaigners.
 Peter W. Adler. Is Circumcision Legal? 16(3) Richmond J. L. & Pub. Int. 439 (2013).
 Amicus curiae briefs filed in Oregon circumcision case:
 Amicus Brief without attachments (Doctors Opposing Circumcision)
 Amicus Brief on the Merits (Doctors Opposing Circumcision)
 Amicus Brief on the Merits (American Jewish Congress, American Jewish Committee, Anti-Defamation League, and Union of Orthodox Jewish Congregations of America)

Circumcision debate
Tort law
Health law